C. Stephen Lynn is an American businessman and philanthropist from Tennessee. He spent the bulk of his career in the fast food industry, serving as the chairman and CEO of the Sonic Corporation from 1983 to 1995, chairman and CEO of Shoney's from 1995 to 1998, and CEO of Back Yard Burgers from 2007 to 2010. Lynn currently serves as CEO of GGR Enterprises, a motorsports marketing enterprises headquarter in North Carolina.

Early life
C. Stephen Lynn graduated from the Tennessee Technological University. He received an M.B.A. from the University of Louisville.

Career
Lynn has spent most of his career as a businessman in the fast food industry. He served as the director of distribution for Kentucky Fried Chicken from 1973 to 1978. He served as the chairman and chief executive officer of the Sonic Corporation from 1983 to 1995, and of Shoney's from 1995 to 1998.

Lynn served as the chairman of Cummins, an engine corporation, from 1999 to 2011. He returned to the fast food industry, serving as the chief executive officer of Back Yard Burgers from 2007 to 2010. In 2012, he founded RP3, a merger and acquisition firm in the fast food industry. He serves as its managing partner. He also serves on the board of directors of Krispy Kreme.

Philanthropy
He serves on the board of directors of the National Cowboy & Western Heritage Museum in Oklahoma City, Oklahoma. He also serves on the board of directors of the Tennessee Tech University Foundation. He serves on the Christian Business Leaders Roundtable.

In 2013, he co-chaired the Tennessee Waltz with his wife at the Tennessee State Capitol, hosted by Tennessee Governor Bill Haslam.

Personal life
He is married to Milah P. Lynn. They reside in Belle Meade, Tennessee, near Nashville.

References

Living people
People from Belle Meade, Tennessee
Tennessee Technological University alumni
Businesspeople from Tennessee
American chief executives
American corporate directors
Fast food
American philanthropists
Year of birth missing (living people)